The 1958–59 Washington Huskies men's basketball team represented the University of Washington for the 1958–59 NCAA University Division basketball season. Led by ninth-year head coach Tippy Dye, the Huskies were members of the Pacific Coast Conference and played their home games on campus at Hec Edmundson Pavilion in Seattle, Washington.

Dye departed after the season in June to become athletic director at Wichita State, succeeded a month later by John Grayson, the head coach at Idaho State.

References

External links
Sports Reference – Washington Huskies: 1958–59 basketball season

Washington Huskies men's basketball seasons
Washington Huskies
Washington
Washington